Oru Iyakkunarin Kadhal Diary is a 2017 Tamil-language Indian film directed by Velu Prabhakaran, starring Prabakaran and Pon Swathi with many newcomers.

Summary 

Oru Iyakkunarin Kadhal Diary is a story of a film director and his experience in film industry.

Cast 

Velu Prabhakaran
Pon Swathi
Ragunath Manet
Jega
Remya

Production 
After the failure of his last few films, Velu Prabhakaran kept away from the film industry for a number of years and launched his film Oru Iyakkunarin Kadhal Diary with himself, Pon Swathi and many newcomers. The film had a launch in August 2015, and had a teaser released during January 2016. Prabakaran said the film is about his experience as a film director in show business. It was also reported that the film is based on actress Silk Smitha's life, but no official confirmation happened on the same. He also said that, his aim is to make people understand the power of divine love and if the film is banned due to its adult content, then it's an insult to the government and not to him. The film was shot at Kodaikanal, Khajuraho and Jaipur. The trailer of the film was released during May 2017. Associate director of Dinesh Rock

References

External links 
 

2017 films
2010s Tamil-language films
Films scored by Ilaiyaraaja
Films about filmmaking
Films about actors
Films shot in Kodaikanal
Films shot in Rajasthan
Films directed by Velu Prabhakaran